VKation is a Danish pop music duo from Odense, Denmark. The band was formed by the cousins Victor Vedel Kruse &  William Vedel Kristensen to compete in the tenth season of the Danish version of the X Factor. They were eliminated in the semi-final, coming in 4th place.

Performances during X Factor

Discography

EPs

Singles

References

External links

Danish musical duos
X Factor (Danish TV series) contestants
People from Odense